Speciality goods are a class of consumer goods. Consumer goods can be categorized into convenience goods, shopping goods, and specialty goods. The classification scheme is based on the way consumers purchase. This system is based on the definition that convenience and speciality goods are both purchased with a predetermined pattern in mind. In the case of the convenience good, the pattern is that the most accessible brand will be purchased; in the case of a speciality good, the pattern is that only a specific brand will be purchased. For example, if the customer utilizes an outlet because it is the most accessible, it would be considered, for that customer at least, a convenience store; while one in which the consumer shops even if he has to go considerably out of his way to reach it, would be considered a speciality store. A shopping good is one in which the consumer does not have a predetermined pattern in mind. Likewise, a shopping store is one which the consumer will undertake a search to select a store to patronize.

Classification
 Convenience store – convenience good. The consumer prefers to buy the most readily available brand of product at the most accessible store.
 Convenience store – shopping good. The consumer selects his purchase from among the assortment carried by the most accessible store.
 Convenience store – speciality good. The consumer purchases his favored brand from the most accessible store which has the item in stock.

Shopping store – convenience good. The consumer is indifferent to the brand of product he buys, but shops among different stores in order to secure better retail service and/or lower retail price.
 Shopping store – shopping good. The consumer makes comparisons among both retail controlled factors and factors associated with the product (brand).
 Shopping store – speciality good. The consumer has a sto the brand of the product, but shops among a number of stores in order to secure the best retail service and/or price for this brand.

 Speciality store – convenience good. The consumer prefers to trade at a specific store, but is indifferent to the brand of product purchased.
 Speciality store – shopping good. The consumer prefers to trade at a certain store, but is uncertain as to which product he wishes to buy and examines the store’s assortment for the best purchase.
 Speciality store – speciality good. The consumer has both a preference for a particular store and a specific brand. It would be naïve for the channel selector to assume that his market would not fall into only one or perhaps two of the various categories. He must study the market to see where his consumers concentrate.

Buying behavior
Brands of high consumer loyalty are less likely to lose sales because they are not in many outlets. A speciality good choice is made by the buyer with respect to its value of the product in his life. When a certain decision has been made, he is unlikely to change the loyalty associated with the product to some other brand. At that moment, the consumer does not worry about the availability of that product in his area of convenience.

References
 
 
 

Goods (economics)